Pandemis perispersa is a moth of the family Tortricidae. It is found in north Madagascar.

The female has a wingspan of 30 mm. The head is light ochreous with a long palpus of about five times the eye diameter. The thorax is pale ochreous suffused with light purplish fulvous. The abdomen is pale ochreous with purple points. The forewings are oblong truncate, costa moderately sinuate (wavy). They are light fulvous (tawny) evenly suffused with light grey, with a purple tinge and in certain lights with a golden gloss. The costal edge is narrowly white.

The hindwings are whitish yellow with the apical third suffused with light fulvous and transversed with purplish grey.

References

Moths described in 1970
Pandemis
Moths of Madagascar
Moths of Africa